Záhorská Bystrica is a city borough of Bratislava, the capital of Slovakia. It is located in the northern part of the city, lying on the foothills of the Pezinok Carpathians, part of the Little Carpathians mountain range. It is part of the Bratislava IV administrative district. The city borough covers 32 kilometres squared and is home to approximately 5,000 inhabitants. Záhorská Bystrica is a small borough at the outskirts of the city with preserved peasants' houses and more recent modern villas and estates. 

Záhorská Bystrica features a baroque parish building, Roman Catholic Church of Saint Peter and Saint Paul from 1834, Chapel of Saint John of Nepomuk from 1896, Chapel of Saints Cosmas and Damian from 1839, Chapel of Virgin Mary of Lourdes from 1913 and Chapel of Saint Vendelin. The borough is home to Slovakia's major TV station, TV Markíza.

History
The first preserved written account of the settlement dates to 1208 under the name Bisztric. Croatian settlement here dates to 1520. The settlement became a part of Bratislava on 1 January 1972.

See also
 Boroughs and localities of Bratislava

References

External links
 Official website 

Boroughs of Bratislava
Villages in Slovakia merged with towns